The Landlord and Tenant Act 1987 (c 31) is an Act of the Parliament of the United Kingdom.

Overview

The Landlord and Tenant Act 1987 is, amongst other things, very significant to leaseholders in England and Wales. Significant alterations were made to sections 18 - 30 of the Landlord and Tenant Act 1985. The 1987 Act also introduced three new things of lasting significance to long leaseholders of particular relevance in relation to their service charge liabilities. Firstly, it gave leaseholders and landlords specific rights to apply to a court or tribunal to vary the terms of a lease. Secondly, it introduced specific rules about retaining service charge contributions in designated trust accounts. Thirdly, it introduced an obligation for Landlords to provide their name and address when issuing service charge demands. Sections 47 and 48 of the 1987 Act state that without this information, service charge demands to leaseholders in England and Wales are invalid.

Section 62 - Short title, commencement and extent

Orders made under section 62(2)
The Landlord and Tenant Act 1987 (Commencement No. 1) Order 1987 (S.I. 1987/2177 (C.66))
The Landlord and Tenant Act 1987 (Commencement No. 2) Order 1988 (S.I. 1988/480 (C.12))
The Landlord and Tenant Act 1987 (Commencement No. 3) Order 1988 (S.I. 1988/1283 (C.48))

See also
Landlord and Tenant Act

References
Halsbury's Statutes,

External links
The Landlord and Tenant Act 1987, as amended from the National Archives.
The Landlord and Tenant Act 1987, as originally enacted from the National Archives.
Guide to the Landlord and Tenant Act 1987 for leaseholders

United Kingdom Acts of Parliament 1987
Landlord–tenant law